Pasir Ris Town Park is a 14-hectare park located in the residential area of Pasir Ris, Singapore. It features wide open spaces and a large marine pond for fishing. It is the location of Pasir Ris Central Hawker Centre, the second hawker centre in Singapore to be located within a park.

Attractions
A recreational fishing and prawning center provides fishing and prawning with food and beverages sales.

A hawker centre is located within the park and was opened on 25 January 2018. It is the second hawker centre in Singapore to be located within a park after East Coast Lagoon Food Centre. It is managed by NTUC Foodfare and features 42 hawker stalls and 770 seats. The hawker centre is styled as a place that mixes traditional hawker fare with hipster subculture.

See also
List of Parks in Singapore

References

External links
Pasir Ris Town Park on National Parks Board, Singapore

Parks in Singapore